Richard John Fowler (March 30, 1921 – May 22, 1972) was a Canadian professional baseball player. Born in Toronto, Fowler was a starting pitcher in Major League Baseball who appeared in 221 total games pitched—170 of them starts (77 percent)—for the Philadelphia Athletics (– and –).

Career
In his ten-season career, Fowler posted a 66–79 record with 11 shutouts, 75 complete games, 382 strikeouts, and a 4.11 ERA in 1,303 innings pitched, allowing 1,367 hits and 578 bases on balls. He pitched over 200 innings each year from 1946 to 1949, and pitched all 16 innings of a 1–0 loss to the St. Louis Browns in 1942.

During World War II, he served with the 48th Highlanders of Canada regiment in the Canadian Army, whose members wear kilts as part of their ceremonial dress.

Fowler threw a nine-inning 1–0 no-hitter against the St. Louis Browns at Shibe Park on September 9, 1945, in his first start in three years and his first major league shutout. Fowler allowed four bases on balls and faced 29 batters, two over the minimum. He was aided by two double plays.

Dick Fowler died from kidney and liver ailments at the age of 51 in Oneonta, New York, on May 22, 1972 and last worked as hotel clerk.

Fowler was posthumously named to the Canadian Baseball Hall of Fame in the Class of 1985.

See also
List of Major League Baseball players from Canada
List of Major League Baseball no-hitters
List of Major League Baseball players who spent their entire career with one franchise

References

External links

Dick Fowler - Baseballbiography.com
Philadelphia Athletics Historical Society
The Deadball Era

1921 births
1972 deaths
Baseball pitchers
Baseball players from Toronto
Batavia Clippers players
Canadian expatriate baseball players in the United States
Charleston Senators players
Cornwall Maple Leafs players
Major League Baseball pitchers
Major League Baseball players from Canada
Oneonta Indians players
People from Oneonta, New York
Philadelphia Athletics players
Toronto Maple Leafs (International League) players
Canadian Baseball Hall of Fame inductees